The 1876 Leeds by-election was fought on 15 August 1876.  The by-election was fought due to the resignation of the incumbent Liberal MP, Robert Meek Carter.  It was won by the Liberal candidate John Barran.

References

1876 in England
1876 elections in the United Kingdom
By-elections to the Parliament of the United Kingdom in Leeds constituencies
19th century in Leeds